From February 20 to June 12, 1984, voters of the Democratic Party chose its nominee for president in the 1984 United States presidential election. Former Vice President Walter Mondale was selected as the nominee through a series of primary elections and caucuses culminating in the 1984 Democratic National Convention held from July 16 to July 19, 1984, in San Francisco, California.

Primary race
Only three candidates won any state primaries: Walter Mondale, Gary Hart, and Jesse Jackson. Initially, former Vice President Mondale was viewed as the favorite to win the Democratic nomination. Mondale had the largest number of party leaders supporting him, and he had raised more money than any other candidate. However, both Jackson and Hart emerged as surprising, and troublesome, opponents for Mondale.

Jackson was the second African-American (after Shirley Chisholm) to mount a nationwide campaign for the presidency, and he was the first African-American candidate to be a serious contender. He garnered 3.5 million votes during the primaries, third behind Hart and Mondale. He managed to win Washington DC, South Carolina, and Louisiana, and split Mississippi, where there were two separate contests for Democratic delegates. Through the primaries, Jackson helped confirm the black electorate's importance to the Democratic Party in the South at the time. During the campaign, however, Jackson made an off-the-cuff reference to Jews as "Hymies" and New York City as "Hymietown", for which he later apologized.  Nonetheless, the remark was widely publicized, and derailed his campaign for the nomination.  Jackson ended up winning 21% of the national primary vote but received only 8% of the delegates to the national convention, and he initially charged that his campaign was hurt by the same party rules that allowed Mondale to win. He also poured scorn on Mondale, saying that Hubert Humphrey was the "last significant politician out of the St. Paul-Minneapolis" area.

Colorado Senator Gary Hart was little-known when he announced his run February 1983, and barely received above 1% in the polls compared to other well-known figures. To counter this, Hart started campaigning early in New Hampshire, making a then-unprecedented canvassing tour in late September, months before the primary. This strategy attracted national media attention to his campaign, and by late 1983, he had risen moderately in the polls to the middle of the field, mostly at the expense of the sinking candidacies of John Glenn and Alan Cranston. Mondale easily won the Iowa caucus in late February, but Hart polled a better-than-expected 16%. A week later, in the New Hampshire primary, he shocked much of the party establishment and the media by defeating Mondale by ten percentage points. Hart instantly became the main challenger to Mondale for the nomination, and appeared to have the momentum on his side.

Hart criticized Mondale as an "old-fashioned" Great Society Democrat who symbolized "failed policies" of the past. Hart positioned himself as a younger, fresher, and more moderate Democrat who could appeal to younger voters. He emerged as a formidable candidate, winning the key Ohio and California primaries as well as several others, especially in the West. However, Hart could not overcome Mondale's financial and organizational advantages, especially among labor union leaders in the Midwest and industrial Northeast. Hart was also badly hurt during a televised debate when Mondale used a popular television commercial slogan to ridicule Hart's vague "New Ideas" platform. Turning to Hart on camera, Mondale said that whenever he heard Hart talk about his "New Ideas", he was reminded of the Wendy's fast-food slogan "Where's the beef?". The remark drew loud laughter and applause from the audience and caught Hart off-guard. Hart never fully recovered from Mondale's charge that his "New Ideas" were shallow and lacking in specifics. Earlier in the same Democratic primary debate, Hart committed a serious faux pas that largely went underreported.  Asked what he would do if an unidentified airplane flew over the Iron Curtain from a Warsaw Pact nation, Hart replied that he would send up a United States Air Force plane and instruct them to determine whether or not it was an enemy plane by looking in the cockpit window to see if the pilots were wearing uniforms. Fellow candidate John Glenn, a former Marine Corps fighter pilot, replied that this was physically impossible.

At a roundtable debate between the three remaining Democratic candidates moderated by Phil Donahue, Mondale and Hart got in such a heated argument over the issue of U.S. policy in Central America that Jackson had to tap his water glass on the table to get them to simmer down.

Mondale gradually pulled away from Hart in the delegate count, but the race was not decided until June, on "Super Tuesday III".  Decided that day were delegates from five states:  South Dakota, New Mexico, West Virginia, and the big prizes of California and New Jersey.  The proportional nature of delegate selection meant that Mondale was likely to obtain enough delegates on that day to secure the stated support of an overall majority of delegates, and hence the nomination, no matter who actually "won" the states contested.  However, Hart maintained that unpledged superdelegates that had previously claimed support for Mondale would shift to his side if he swept the Super Tuesday III primary.  Once again, Hart committed a faux pas, insulting New Jersey shortly before the primary day.  Campaigning in California, he remarked that while the "bad news" was that he and his wife Lee had to campaign separately, "[t]he good news for her is that she campaigns in California while I campaign in New Jersey."  Compounding the problem, when his wife interjected that she "got to hold a koala bear," Hart replied that "I won't tell you what I got to hold: samples from a toxic-waste dump."  While Hart won California, he lost New Jersey after leading in polls by as much as 15 points.

By the time the Democratic Convention started in San Francisco, Mondale had more than enough delegates to win the Democratic nomination. However, after Mondale's loss to Ronald Reagan, Hart would quickly emerge as the frontrunner for the 1988 Democratic Party's presidential nomination. He would maintain that status until a sex scandal derailed his candidacy in 1987.

Mondale's nomination marked only the fifth time that the Democratic Party nominated a private citizen for President (i.e., not serving in an official government role at the time of the nomination and election), following former Georgia Governor Jimmy Carter in 1976, who followed former Illinois Governor Adlai Stevenson II in 1956, who followed former West Virginia Congressman John W. Davis in 1924, who was preceded by former President Grover Cleveland in 1892. The Democratic Party did not nominate another private citizen until former Secretary of State Hillary Clinton, in 2016. Four years later, the party nominated former vice president Joe Biden. Of the seven private-citizen Democratic nominees, only Jimmy Carter, Grover Cleveland, and Joe Biden won their respective presidential elections.

Candidates

Nominee

Withdrew during primaries or convention

Withdrew during primaries

Declined to run 

 Governor Bruce Babbitt of Arizona
Senator Lloyd Bentsen of Texas
Senator Joe Biden of Delaware
 Senator Bill Bradley of New Jersey
 Governor John Y. Brown of Kentucky
 Senator Dale Bumpers of Arkansas
 Former President Jimmy Carter of Georgia (endorsed Mondale)
 Governor Mario Cuomo of New York
 Delegate Walter Fauntroy of Washington D.C. (endorsed Jackson)
 Senator Ted Kennedy of Massachusetts (Dec. 1, 1982)
 Senator Daniel Patrick Moynihan of New York
 Governor Jay Rockefeller of West Virginia
 Former DNC Chairman Robert S. Strauss of Texas
Representative Mo Udall of Arizona

Polling

Before 1983

1983

1984

Results by state

Convention

The candidates for U.S. president earned the following numbers of delegates:

When he made his acceptance speech at the Democratic Convention, Mondale said: "Let's tell the truth. Mr. Reagan will raise taxes, and so will I. He won't tell you. I just did." Although Mondale intended to expose Reagan as hypocritical and position himself as the honest candidate, the choice of taxes as a discussion point likely damaged his electoral chances.

Vice-Presidential nominee
Mondale chose U.S. Rep. Geraldine A. Ferraro of New York as his running mate and she was confirmed by acclamation, making her the first woman nominated for that position by a major party.

Aides later said that Mondale was determined to establish a precedent with his vice presidential candidate, considering San Francisco Mayor (Later U.S. Senator) Dianne Feinstein and Governor of Kentucky Martha Layne Collins, who were also female; Los Angeles Mayor Tom Bradley, an African American; and San Antonio Mayor Henry Cisneros, a Hispanic, as other finalists for the nomination. Unsuccessful nomination candidate Jackson derided Mondale's vice-presidential screening process as a "P.R. parade of personalities"; however, he praised Mondale for his choice.

Others however preferred Senator Lloyd Bentsen because he would appeal to more conservative Southern voters. Nomination rival Gary Hart had also been lobbying for the vice-presidential spot on the ticket once it became apparent that Mondale had clinched the majority of delegates; Hart's supporters claimed he would do better than Mondale against President Reagan, an argument undercut by a June 1984 Gallup poll that showed both men nine points behind the President.

Politicians considered for vice presidential nomination:

See also
 Republican Party presidential primaries, 1984

References